Peter Fenson (born February 29, 1968 in Bemidji, Minnesota) is an American curler. He was the  skip of the men's rink that represented the United States at the 2006 Winter Olympics, where they won the bronze medal, the first Olympic medal for the United States in curling. He has won eight national championships, the most recent in Philadelphia in March 2014, and six as skip.

Career
Fenson took up curling at age 13; his father, Bob Fenson, won the 1979 national championships and is now the coach of Pete's rink. Pete Fenson was a third on the national champion rinks in 1993 and 1994, and his rink, skipped by Scott Baird, made it to the semifinals of the 1993 World Curling Championship and placed fifth in 1994.

Fenson was the skip of the rink which won the 2003 U.S. national championship, and went on to take eighth place at the 2003 Ford World Curling Championship. He also participated in the 2003 Continental Cup of Curling. After finishing as runner-up in the 2004 U.S. championships, Fenson's rink won the 2005 national championship. At the 2005 World Championship, Fenson's rink finished the preliminary round in a six-way tie for first place, but was eliminated from competition in a tie-breaker against defending Olympic champion Norway. Still, Fenson's sixth-place finish earned his rink the right to represent the U.S. at the 2006 Winter Olympics in Turin, Italy.

At the Olympics, Fenson's rink had a 6–3 record in the round robin portion of the tournament, losing only to Italy and eventual finalists Finland and Canada. This put the rink in a three-way tie for second place with Canada and Great Britain; Fenson's rink faced Brad Gushue's Canadian rink in the semifinal, losing 11–5 in nine ends. Two days later, however, the rink rebounded to defeat David Murdoch's Great Britain rink in the bronze medal game 8–6, securing the first-ever American Olympic medal in curling. On January 16, 2007, the team was named the 2006 USOC Team of the Year.

Fenson's teammates in the 2009-10 curling season were Shawn Rojeski (third), Joe Polo (second), and Tyler George (lead). The team's lead for the past four years (including the 2006 Olympics), John Shuster, had decided in 2006 to depart from the team to form his own team. Fenson won the 2010 USA National Championships, which took place in Kalamazoo, Michigan. His victory earned him the right to play for the US at the 2010 World Championship in Cortina d'Ampezzo, where he and his rink finished 4th after two disappointing losses in the playoffs to David Smith's rink from Scotland. Tyler George soon left to form his own team.

With Ryan Brunt playing at the lead position, Fenson and his rink participated at the 2011 Continental Cup of Curling, where Team North America defeated Team World in a record-breaking performance. His team then went to the 2011 US Nationals and, after winning some tight matches, finished the round robin with an undefeated 9-0 win–loss record. He then edged Tyler George out in the playoffs and in the finals to become the repeat US champion, winning his seventh US national championship. He and his team represented the United States at the 2011 Ford World Men's Curling Championship at Regina, Saskatchewan in April. The team opened with a win against Denmark, but suffered a series of close losses and finished in 10th place with a 3-8 win–loss record, their worst at a world championship.

Fenson and his team missed the playoffs at the first three events for their 2011–12 World Curling Tour season. However, they had better fortune at the Laphroaig Scotch Open, where they flew through the knockout round and defeated David Brown in the final to win the event. Fenson and his rink were selected to represent the United States at the 2012 USA-Brazil Challenge to play against Brazil for a spot in the World Championships in Basel, but Brazil withdrew from the challenge. Fenson then participated in the 2012 Continental Cup of Curling, where Team World won a close tournament over Team North America. Fenson participated in the 2012 United States Men's Curling Championship, and went through the round robin with a 9–1 win–loss record. In the playoffs, he was defeated by Heath McCormick, who had previously beaten him in the round robin, but rebounded with a win in the semifinal over former teammate John Shuster. In the final, he lost a close game to Heath McCormick, losing his bid for a third consecutive nationals title and a chance to play at the world championships.

Fenson and his team played at the 2013 United States Men's Curling Championship, but failed to qualify for the playoffs, losing to McCormick in a five-team tiebreaker.

Upon their semifinal win at the 2012 United States Men's Curling Championship, Fenson and his team were qualified to participate at the 2014 United States Olympic Curling Trials. Fenson and his team finished second in the round robin, and played John Shuster in the three-game final round, but lost after a lopsided third game. Fenson was hired by NBC Sports to work as a curling analyst during the Olympic games.

Personal life
Fenson is married to his wife Roxanne and has two sons, Alex and Graem. He enjoys golf, biking, and spending time with family. His brother, Eric Fenson, is a curler and former teammate. His son Alex is a member of his team.

Fenson has a bachelor's degree in technical illustration and graphic design. He is the owner of a restaurant, Dave's Pizza, which operates in Bemidji, Minnesota. He is currently employed as a coach with USA Curling.

Grand Slam record
Fenson was only active in Grand Slam events between 2003 and 2009

Teams

Awards and honors
USA Curling Athlete of the Year: 2003, 2005, 2011
USA Curling Team of the Year: 2006
United States Olympic Committee Team of the Month: December 2005
United States Olympic Committee Team of the Year: 2006

See also
Curling at the 2006 Winter Olympics

References

External links
 
 
 
 
 

1968 births
Living people
People from Bemidji, Minnesota
American male curlers
Curlers at the 2006 Winter Olympics
Curling broadcasters
Olympic curlers of the United States
Olympic bronze medalists for the United States in curling
Medalists at the 2006 Winter Olympics
American curling champions
Continental Cup of Curling participants
American curling coaches